Mariano Ceferino De Fino Silveiro (born 11 May 1983 in Salto) is a Uruguayan cyclist, who currenly rides for amateur team CA Villa Teresa.

Major results
2002
 1st  Overall Vuelta Ciclista de la Juventud
2004
 3rd Time trial, Italian Under–23 Road Championships
2006
 6th Overall Vuelta Ciclista a León
2010
 2nd Time trial, National Road Championships
 5th Overall Vuelta del Uruguay
2011
 5th Overall Rutas de America
 9th Overall Vuelta del Uruguay
2012
 5th Overall Rutas de America
2014
 1st  Overall Vuelta del Uruguay

References

External links

1983 births
Living people
Uruguayan male cyclists
Sportspeople from Salto, Uruguay